Oliver Edward Ackermann (born November 22, 1976) is an American rock musician, who is the founder of the Brooklyn-based effects pedal company Death By Audio and is  guitarist and vocalist for A Place to Bury Strangers, a rock band hailed as "the loudest band in New York".

Biography
Ackermann was born in Allentown, Pennsylvania. He spent his childhood in St. Peter, Minnesota and Fredericksburg, Virginia attending Falmouth Elementary School, Drew Middle School, and Stafford High School.

Ackermann studied Industrial Design at the Rhode Island School of Design.  He returned to Fredericksburg, Virginia and worked at Zolo Designs.

Ackermann currently resides in Brooklyn, New York and is a contributor to the Death By Audio space and collective.

Musical career
In 1995, Ackermann formed Skywave with Paul Baker. The duo joined with John Fedowitz on drums and put out recordings and toured during 1998 to 2003.

In 2002, Ackermann started the effects pedal company Death By Audio.

When Baker and Fedowitz formed Ceremony, Ackermann moved to Brooklyn in 2003 and formed the band A Place to Bury Strangers with Tim Gregorio on bass and Justin Avery on drums.

In 2007, he teamed up with Richard Fearless from Death In Vegas to form Black Acid only to later disband it as A Place to Bury Strangers was gaining global acclaim.

Death by Audio
At Death by Audio, Ackermann designs and manufactures hand-wired guitar-effects pedals, and has provided custom effects equipment to bands such as U2, Wilco, and Nine Inch Nails.

The Death By Audio location also operates as a live/work environment for artists and musicians, recording studio, and art/music venue.

References

External links
 Death by Audio website
 A Place To Bury Strangers website

1976 births
Living people
American rock guitarists
American male guitarists
American musical instrument makers
Musicians from Allentown, Pennsylvania
People from St. Peter, Minnesota
People from Fredericksburg, Virginia
Mute Records artists
Dead Oceans artists
Important Records artists
21st-century American guitarists
21st-century American male musicians
American post-punk musicians